Stephen Edward Smith  (September 24, 1927 – August 19, 1990) was the husband of Jean Ann Kennedy. He was a financial analyst and political strategist in the 1960 United States presidential campaign of his brother-in-law John F. Kennedy.

Early life
Smith was born in Bayport, Long Island, New York, to Julia A. (Cleary), daughter of four-term Congressman William E. Cleary, and John Joseph Smith, and grew up in the Bay Ridge section of Brooklyn. He attended Georgetown University, graduating in 1948 with a bachelor's degree in history.  He served during the Korean War as a first lieutenant in the U.S. Air Force from 1951–1952.

Career
Smith joined his family's business, Cleary Brothers Inc., which operated tugs and barges on New York's upstate canals and in New York Harbor. He then headed the Park Agency Inc., in Manhattan, where he managed $300 million in Kennedy family investments.

After his father-in-law Joseph P. Kennedy Sr. suffered a stroke on December 19, 1961, Smith managed the family's fortune out of a New York City office building. He was responsible for overseeing the trusts that benefited him and his family as well as the other children and grandchildren of Joe and Rose Kennedy.

Kennedy campaigns
Smith played an active role in JFK's 1960 presidential campaign, and was working as Kennedy's campaign manager for re-election in 1964 at the time when President Kennedy was assassinated in Dallas, Texas on November 22, 1963. Smith served as United States Senator Robert F. Kennedy's campaign manager during his 1968 presidential run at the time when the Senator was assassinated at the Ambassador Hotel in Los Angeles, California on June 5, 1968. In the fall of 1979, as polls showed that Senator Ted Kennedy could easily defeat President Jimmy Carter in the Democratic primaries, Kennedy announced his candidacy and made Smith his campaign manager. Kennedy lost to Carter and chose to not run again.

Personal life
Smith and Jean Ann Kennedy were married May 19, 1956 in St. Patrick's Cathedral in Midtown Manhattan, at which point he became the brother-in-law of future President John F. Kennedy.  Stephen and Jean had two biological sons and later adopted two daughters:

 Stephen Edward Smith, Jr. (b. 1957)
 William Kennedy Smith (b. 1960)
 Amanda Mary Smith (b. 1967)
 Kym Maria Smith (b. 1972)

Illness and death
A longtime smoker, Smith died from lung cancer at his home in Manhattan on August 19, 1990, at age 62.

See also
 Kennedy family tree

References

External links

1927 births
1990 deaths
People from Bayport, New York
Georgetown College (Georgetown University) alumni
United States Air Force officers
United States Air Force personnel of the Korean War
Businesspeople from New York City
Kennedy family
People from Bay Ridge, Brooklyn
Deaths from lung cancer in New York (state)
Military personnel from New York City